The Golden Rooster Award for Best Picture is an award given to the best film at the Golden Rooster Awards.

Award winners

References

Golden Rooster, Best Picture
Picture
Awards for best film